Wieczysta Kraków is a Polish football club based in Kraków. They currently play in III liga, the fourth tier of the national football league system.

History
During the German occupation (World War II), it was forbidden to organize football matches under the threat of severe repression. Due to these restrictions on the meadows of Rakowice, then a village on the borders of Krakow, numerous football competitions were held secretly. Eventually, the local community, on the initiative of Edward Ignaszewski, decided to establish a sports club in such difficult times, thus forming Wieczysta Kraków in 1942.

In the '50s and '60s, Wieczysta Kraków was playing in the class A and B leagues (then the fourth and fifth tiers of the Polish football league). In 1966, with the reorganization of the Polish league system, the III Liga, the new third tier was introduced dividing into regions. Wieczysta Kraków was included in the district league (fourth tier) of Polish league. Performances at such a high level did not last long. In 1968, the team dropped to class A (fifth tier), and a year later it is relegated another class lower, to the sixth tier of Polish league. The following years of the last century brought sports stabilization in the form of regular performances at the regional level.

The club played the 1997/98 season in the IV liga, after winning promotion to the fourth tier. After six years at this level, the club was relegated finishing the 2002/03 season as 18th, the bottom of the table. For the coming twelve seasons, Wieczysta Kraków played in the Liga okręgowa, that was the fifth and after another reorganization in 2008 the sixth tier of the Polish football league. In the 2014/15 season, the club finished 13th (second from bottom) in the Liga okręgowa, thus getting relegated to the seventh tier. In the first season in Klasa A, the club finished second, thus missing out on immediate promotion back to the sixth tier. The next season, 2016/17, they finished first in the league, thus winning promotion back to Liga okręgowa.

In 2021, they won promotion to IV liga, finishing first in regional league's Kraków II group. They were the richest amateur club in the country at the time, and won the league with 28 wins out of 28 games, scoring 216 and conceding only 8. On 29 September 2021, they achieved their first victory in the central level of the Polish Cup, winning 2–1 against the I liga club Chrobry Głogów and advancing to the cup's round of 32.

In the 2021–22 season Wieczysta finished the league season in first place, with 93 points and losing only one game all season, finishing eleven points ahead of second placed Wiślanie Jaśkowice. The team then had to face the champion of the other Małopolska group: the reserves of Bruk-Bet Termalica Nieciecza. The first leg took place on 25 June 2022 in Kraków which Wieczysta won 4–0 with all goals coming from Maciej Jankowski. Wieczysta won the second leg 3–0 winning the tie 7–0 on aggregate, and were promoted to the III liga securing a second consecutive promotion.

Season to season

Notes: P - Promoted, R - Relegated

Polish Cup records

Achievements
Polish Cup:
National
Round of 32: 2021–22
Lesser Poland
Winners: 2020–21
Finalist: 2019–20
IV liga Małopolska West group
Winner: 2021–22
Kraków District
Winner: 2019–20, 2020–21
Finalist: 1952, 2016–17
District League
Kraków Division Group II
Winners: 2020–21
Runners-up: 2018–19, 2019–20
A Division
Kraków Division Group II
Winner: 2016–17
Runners-up: 2015–16

Players

Current squad

References

External links
 

Football clubs in Kraków
Football clubs in Poland
Association football clubs established in 1942
1942 establishments in Poland